A by-election was held for the New South Wales Legislative Assembly electorate of Ashfield on 16 August 1905 because of the resignation of Frederick Winchcombe who took an extended trip to Europe.

Dates

Result
				
				
				

				
				
				

Frederick Winchcombe resigned.

See also
Electoral results for the district of Ashfield
List of New South Wales state by-elections

Notes

References

1905 elections in Australia
New South Wales state by-elections
1900s in New South Wales